Levenshulme is an area of Manchester, in Greater Manchester, England, bordering Fallowfield, Longsight, Gorton, Burnage, Heaton Chapel and Reddish; it is approximately halfway between Stockport and Manchester city centre on the A6. Levenshulme is predominantly residential with numerous fast food shops, public houses and antique stores. It has a multi-cultural and multi-ethnic population of 15,430 at the 2011 Census. The Manchester to London railway line passes through Levenshulme railway station.

Historically in Lancashire, Levenshulme is a former township and became a part of Manchester in 1909. Levenshulme, like its neighbour Longsight, was historically a wealthy and middle class district of Manchester, though in the 20th century Levenshulme and many surrounding areas suffered from inner city decline. However, the area is now displaying signs of gentrification and has been described as one of Manchester's most "up and coming" neighbourhoods.

History
The very early history is so obscure as to be virtually non-existent. Many of the nearby suburbs, such as Withington, Didsbury, Gorton etc., had a history of developing as villages, but for some reason Levenshulme did not. It has had several names over the millennia (according to East Lancashire expert Eilert Ekwall), including: in 1246 it was called "de Lewyneshulm", in 1322 "Levensholme" and in 1587 it was called "Lensom". The name itself is derived from a possessive version of a person's name, "Leofwine's" and "holm", a Viking term meaning island (usually in a lake or river).  "Lywenshulme" also is referred to in the 1322 survey of Manchester and Collegiate Church charters refer to "Leysholme" (1556), "Lensholme" (1578) and "Lentsholme" (1635). The "hulme" element is common in Manchester, and was pronounced "Oom", hence Levenshulme was traditionally "Levenzoom" to the residents and nicknamed as Levy, recently mispelt as Leve.

The main A6, Stockport Road, dates from 1724 when a turnpike was built between Manchester and Stockport.

The district of East Levenshulme used to be known as Talleyrand. It included Talleyrand House (later renamed as Barlow House) and a street, Talleyrand Row. It was said the French statesman Talleyrand once stayed there during his exile from France (French Revolution), presumably at some point during 1792–94. The place name "Talley Rand" is also found on the old post office sorting labels displayed in the POD café based in the former main post office. There is now a pub called "Talleyrand", on the A6.

Legend has it that the famous highwayman Dick Turpin often visited the Blue Bell Inn on Barlow Road which shares the name of his birthplace. There has been an inn on this site for 700 years. The current pub was built after the previous Blue Bell Inn was destroyed during a German bombing raid in the Second World War.

Levenshulme, a dependency of Withington, was once feudal land held by the Lord of the Manor of Levenshulme. In 1319, possession was given to William Legh of Baguley by his grandfather Sir William de Baguley of Baguley in Cheshire.  William Legh's descendants continued to hold the Manor until the 17th century.

In 1917, the McVitie & Price biscuit factory was opened.

Housing

The typical housing of Levenshulme consists of terraced houses, the majority of which were built circa 1880–1890. The style of houses are what are known colloquially as "two up-two downs". With a bedroom above each lower room, the house is bisected by a steep, narrow staircase. A kitchen was to the rear. Right up to the 1980s it wasn't uncommon for the original outside toilet (to the rear of the kitchen) to still be present, and some houses still had no bathroom or central heating.

The layout of the streets which contain these terraces are typical of the area and consist of grid layouts intersected with wide back entries which run the length of the terrace blocks at the rear and at each end of the block. This alley/back-entry layout is supposed to be because of an old by-law of the Levenshulme local authority that every terraced house had to have a front garden and allow access to the back door by a horse and cart to enable rubbish to be removed without the need enter the house.

These back entries are now generally considered to be a threat to home security. Accordingly Manchester City Council has, over recent years, helped residents by funding a "gated alley" response to the threat. When the majority of affected residents of a particular entry are in agreement the entries have iron gates set up at all ingress and egress points with all affected residents being issued a key.

Governance

Manchester and its districts had developed into what were referred to as the "Thirty Townships". Levenshulme was one of them and in 1865 got its own 'board' which shortly thereafter developed into an urban district council. Prior to the turn of the 20th century West Levenshulme was considered to be a "dormitory" for Manchester. This description eventually changed to one of "residential suburb" a decade or so later, but East Levenshulme was still primarily industrial in nature consisting mostly of print works, bleach works, dye works and mattress works. In spite of the preponderance of industrial works there were also several farms, and the area around what is now Levenshulme High School was considered to be semi-rural until the 1920s.

Until the late 19th century Manchester's outlying townships had to supply their own amenities. This was becoming increasingly difficult for the urban councils to do and as a result there was a considerable difference in prices charged to the residents compared to the prices charged by Manchester itself. Manchester refused to alleviate these difficulties unless townships agreed to come under its control. As a result the townships slowly began to amalgamate into Manchester's rule. Along with Withington, Levenshulme protested at the discrepancy of prices for gas in the city and for the outlying townships that were already supplied by Manchester. Nevertheless many of those townships arranged to get their electricity from Manchester, possibly in the hope that they would benefit from the city's plans to electrify the tram system when the existing lease with the Manchester Carriage and Tramways Company was due to end in 1901. Along with Gorton, Levenshulme joined Manchester in 1909. The tramways were extended to serve Levenshulme before the start of the First World War in 1914.

The ward boundaries of Levenshulme have been moved in recent ward reorganisations, and as a result large areas in the north and east of Levenshulme are now officially in the ward of Gorton South, to the confusion and irritation of local residents. To the west areas historically regarded as Fallowfield are now officially part of Levenshulme and Rusholme.

Levenshulme forms part of the wider Manchester Gorton Parliamentary constituency and has been represented in Westminster by Afzal Khan since June 2017.

Councillors
The Levenshulme ward is represented in Manchester City Council by three Labour councillors: Basat Sheikh, Zahid Hussain and Dzidra Noor.

 indicates seat up for re-election.

Demography

In 1830, Levenshulme had a population of 768.

In 2001, Levenshulme had an Irish population of approximately 7.0% which was twice the Manchester average, and, as a consequence, it was sometimes called County Levenshulme in reference to the county structure in Ireland, though the 2011 census figures show the Irish population has shrunk to 4.1%. Increasing numbers of Irish have moved to inner Stockport or back to develop their homeland. The demographics within the district have changed, with increasing numbers of (mostly Muslim) people of South Asian origin and an ever-increasing number of Africans have settled in Levenshulme. Over a third of the population belong to an ethnic minority. In recent times, Levenshulme has also seen an influx of Eastern Europeans moving into the area, bringing about Polish confectionery shops. Many students also rent accommodation in the area.

In the 2011 Census, the ethnic make up of Levenshulme was:

Culture

Levenshulme is evolving into an area typical of south Manchester: a mix of pubs, bars, restaurants, takeaways, solicitors, pound shops and booking agents, along with terraced housing. The area is in south-east Manchester and neighbours Heaton Chapel to the south, which is one of the most affluent parts of Greater Manchester.

Levenshulme Market was launched in March 2013 and operates every Saturday, between March and December, from 10 am to 4 pm. It is a social enterprise-run market which prides itself on its diverse range of high quality traders. It has a changing roster of 50 artisan traders selling produce, street food, plants, gifts, vintage clothing and homeware.

Since 1998, the annual Levenshulme Festival usually features 120+ multi-cultural events from firework displays to music concerts.

The community radio station ALL FM is based in Levenshulme.

There is a local amateur dramatic society, Levenshulme Players, who have produced stage plays, comedy reviews, Murder Mystery Evenings and radio plays for ALL FM. They write much of their own material.

Religion

Statistics
Levenshulme has a varied ethnic mix. According to the 2011 Census the breakdown by religion is:

Places of worship

Recreation and leisure

Parks

Green Bank Fields
This park is a green area stretching between Manor Road in the north, Mount Road in the east and Barlow Road in the south and west. It is primarily open grassland but also houses an open-air, enclosed 5-a-side football pitch adjacent to the Mount Road exit.

Until about 1920 the land that Green Bank Fields was on held a dairy farm called Green Bank Farm (Wolfenden's) and a small house called Botany Bay Cottage. The entrance to the farm was originally where the main entrance to the park is now on Barlow Road adjacent to Byrom Parade shops.

Manchester City Council fomented a local controversy by selling off part of Mellands (Greater Manchester Passenger Transport Executive) Playing Fields, Gorton to Dappa Homes to build 149 houses. Dappa is obliged to replace the land they are using to build the homes. In May 2004 Dappa Homes submitted plans to build 3 football pitches, a clubhouse and surround the park with a 10-foot fence on Green Bank Fields. This would have had the effect of reducing the versatile open-space into a restricted use site. The plans were later withdrawn by Dappa.

Highfield Country Park

Highfield Country Park is a  area of open land that stretches to the east of Broom Avenue across to the back of Reddish Golf Course and over to the junction of Longford Road and Nelstrop Road.

In the 1970s it was designated as a country park by the council, but at the time it wasn't much more than a landfill site that was formerly the site of the UCP tripe factory, Jackson's Brickworks, Levenshulme Dye and Bleach Works and High Field Farm. The claypit formed by the extracted clay for the brickworks was much used by local children as a play area, known as "the Brickie".

Until 2004 the park was jointly maintained by Manchester City Council and a group of volunteers called the 'Friends of Highfield Park'. In July 2004 the park came to the attention of the Prudential Grass Roots campaign (run by the BTCV conservation charity). Over a 12-month period the park was transformed from a dreary, vandalised wasteland into a pleasant country park with a picnic area and mapped out country walks.

Nutsford Vale Country Park
Nutsford Vale is a formally declared 'open space' ensuring that it remains green space, and that it does not suffer from adverse building development. The area is a local oasis for bird life, insects and other wildlife, made up of rough grassland and a wide variety of trees, providing a home for a variety of plants and animal species.

The Friends of Nutsford Vale and a committee provide a management and maintenance plan for the site.

There are various access points with the main entrances located at the end of Bickerdike Avenue M12 5SZ and on Matthews Lane M19 3DS.

Cringle Park
Cringle Park is a recreational park located next to Levenshulme High School on Errwood Road, adjoining Crossley Road. It is a small park; however, it features facilities such as a children's play area, football court, basketball court, two tennis courts and a boxing club.

A sundial in the centre of a Stonehenge was erected on top of a small hill in this park, which serves as an aesthetically pleasing spot for families to visit. A small mobile coffee shop on a bicycle serves drinks and snacks.

Cringle Park is managed by Manchester City Council. It has a strong and active Friends of group, who support community events and actively campaign for improvements in the park. 
It is a peaceful open space with many spots to relax in and is also a very popular dog-walking park.

Paths
The Fallowfield Loop shared use path passes through the suburb. It follows the route of the former Fallowfield Loop railway line, which was closed in October 1988. It is approximately 8 miles long and connects Chorlton-cum-Hardy in the west with Fairfield in the east.

It can be accessed beside the site of the former Levenshulme South railway station on the A6.

Sport

Swimming

Levenshulme Swimming Baths was built in the late 19th century and was formerly called "Levenshulme Public Baths and Washhouse" as it also housed the public washhouse at the side.

In the late 1920s and early 1930s Levenshulme Baths was used as a training pool for Longsight resident Sunny Lowry, who, in 1933, was the first British woman to swim the English Channel (from France to England).

Arcadia Sports Centre

Located on Yew Tree Avenue, this sports facility was formerly home to Manchester Roller Hockey Club and affectionately known to locals as "the Shed".

On 20 February 2016, the new Arcadia Leisure Centre opened on the site of the old sports hall.

Community

Library

Levenshulme Library is a "Carnegie library" as it was gifted to the people of Levenshulme by industrialist and philanthropist Andrew Carnegie. The ceremonial laying of the first brick (in reality an engraved stone plaque) took place on 5 December 1903. The stone was laid by George Paulson in his role as Chairman of the Free Library Committee. The library actually opened its doors to the public in 1904. At the time the money was gifted there was a minor local furore as some Levenshulme residents expressed the opinion that it was "immoral" for the then urban district council to accept the money from Carnegie as they believed the money to be "tainted". This was allegedly due to Carnegie's suppression of trade unions in the United States.

In 2012 proposals were put forward by Manchester Council to replace the library by a new building shared with the replacement for the swimming pools. In 2013 these proposals were amended to close both library and pools immediately and to only provide a reduced "book drop-off" service. These proposals were strongly contested by local groups and the building was symbolically taken over for a 24-hour "read-in" as a protest.

In February 2016, Levenshulme Library closed and was replaced by the new Arcadia Library and Leisure Centre on Stockport Road, despite yearly protests.

Education

There are other nearby secondary schools, including Burnage Academy for Boys.

Transport

Railway

A spur of the West Coast Main Line passes through Levenshulme, which is located between Manchester Piccadilly and Stockport.

The area is served by Levenshulme railway station, which provides local Northern stopping services between Manchester, Stockport and locations in Cheshire.

The suburb was once served by Levenshulme South railway station. It was sited on the Fallowfield Loop railway line, which closed to passenger services in 1958; the former trackbed is now a shared-use path between Chorlton and Fairfield.

Buses
Bus services in the area are provided by Stagecoach Manchester. The 192, according to Stagecoach, is the busiest bus route in Great Britain, with around 9 million passengers carried annually. The service runs every 5–10 minutes daily until the late hours.

The following routes serve Levenshulme:
 150: Gorton – Levenshulme – Chorlton-cum-Hardy – Stretford – The Trafford Centre
 191: Manchester (Albert Sq.)– Longsight – Levenshulme – Stockport – Stepping Hill Hospital – Hazel Grove
 192: Manchester (Piccadilly) – Longsight – Levenshulme – Stockport – Stepping Hill Hospital – Hazel Grove
 197: Manchester (Albert Sq.) - Longsight – Levenshulme – Green End – Stockport

Roads
The A6, which connects Carlisle with Luton, passes through Levenshulme; it connects the suburb with Stockport and Manchester city centre.

Tourism

The street with no name

Due to several reports in both local and national newspapers, and on several internet blogs, tourists are now making visits to Levenshulme railway station since the news broke of a street with no name in the area.

The street that the railway station is on is 160 years old and 77 yards long, yet it has no official name and never has had. In May 2007, as a benefit of a £5,000 grant awarded to the Friends of Levenshulme Station by the Awards For All lottery grants scheme, an unofficial road sign was erected at the entrance to the street. The sign gave the name of the street as The Street With No Name. According to local residents, the street had been informally called this for years and it seemed appropriate that it now had a sign so that people could find it. The first sign was fitted approximately three feet from the ground, but was stolen a short time later.

An increasing number of day trippers visit from other cities across the North of England to visit friends and give business custom.

Notable people

Ernest Marples, a Conservative politician, was born and brought up in Levenshulme. Served as the Minister of Transport in the Harold Macmillan and Alec Douglas-Home governments and was elevated to the peerage in 1974.
Rock and pop singer Wayne Fontana
The architect Norman Foster was brought up in Levenshulme.
Dad's Army'''s "Captain Mainwaring", Arthur Lowe, attended Chapel Street School.
Beryl Reid, the comedian, grew up in Manchester where she attended Withington and Levenshulme High Schools.
Actor Graeme Hawley who played John Stape in Coronation Street is a resident.
Professor Terry Callaghan, who was a member of the Lead Authors of the Intergovernmental Panel on Climate Change which won the Nobel Peace Prize in 2007, together with Al Gore. He was brought up in Levenshulme and went to Chapel Street School and Burnage Grammar School. At 14 he struck up a friendship with Alec Cowan, (Councillor, Levenshulme Ward 2004–2010) and the two have remained friends ever since. 
Drummer Tony McCarroll, formerly of Manchester band Oasis
Harry Hancock, a professional footballer, was born in Levenshulme.
Gwyneth Powell, an English actress best known for her portrayal of headmistress Bridget McClusky in the BBC television programme Grange Hill'', was born in Levenshulme.

See also

Listed buildings in Manchester-M19
ALL FM

References

External links

Levenshulme then and now: A personal view
Levenshulme Festival website
Love Levenshulme
Levenshulme Community Association
Levenshulme Churches
Manchester City Council: Image library, containing 1420 images of Levenshulme (as of September 2007)

Areas of Manchester
Irish diaspora in England
Manchester City Council Wards
History of Manchester